1956 Artek, provisional designation , is a dark Themistian asteroid from the outer regions of the asteroid belt, approximately 19 kilometers in diameter. It was discovered on 8 October 1969, by Soviet–Russian astronomer Lyudmila Chernykh at the Crimean Astrophysical Observatory in Nauchnyj. It was named after Artek, a Soviet Young Pioneer camp.

Orbit and classification 

Artek is a dark C-type asteroid and a member of the Themis family, a dynamical family of outer-belt asteroids with nearly coplanar ecliptical orbits. It orbits the Sun in the outer main-belt at a distance of 2.9–3.5 AU once every 5 years and 9 months (2,094 days). Its orbit has an eccentricity of 0.10 and an inclination of 1° with respect to the ecliptic. The first precovery was taken at Goethe Link Observatory in 1954, extending the asteroid's observation arc by 15 years prior to its discovery.

Physical characteristics 

A rotational lightcurve was obtained from photometric observations made by Italian astronomers Roberto Crippa and Federico Manzini in February 2006. The fragmentary lightcurve gave a rotation period of  hours with a low brightness variation of 0.07 magnitude.

According to the space-based surveys carried out by the Japanese Akari satellite and NASA's Wide-field Infrared Survey Explorer, the asteroid measures 18.0 and 19.2 kilometers in diameter with a corresponding albedo of 0.099 of 0.074, respectively. The Collaborative Asteroid Lightcurve Link assumes an albedo of 0.08 and calculates a diameter of 18.7 kilometers with an absolute magnitude of 12.1.

Naming 

This minor planet was named after the Soviet Artek (Арте́к) camp, the first All-Union Young Pioneer camp on the Crimean peninsula. The official  was published by the Minor Planet Center on 30 June 1977.

References

External links 
 Asteroid Lightcurve Database (LCDB), query form (info )
 Dictionary of Minor Planet Names, Google books
 Asteroids and comets rotation curves, CdR – Observatoire de Genève, Raoul Behrend
 Discovery Circumstances: Numbered Minor Planets (1)-(5000) – Minor Planet Center
 
 

001956
Discoveries by Lyudmila Chernykh
Named minor planets
19691008